Dorcadion coelloi is a species of beetle in the family Cerambycidae. It was described by Verdugo in 1995. It is known from Spain.

See also 
Dorcadion

References

coelloi
Beetles described in 1995